"Zumba" is a Latin tropical pop song written by Don Omar and is the second track from the album MTO²: New Generation (2012). The song was released digitally on October 2, 2012. It is the main song for the video game Zumba Fitness Core, which was released in October 2012 for the Kinect and Wii.

Composition
"Zumba" is a mid-tempo reggaeton and pop song with tropical music influences.

Charts

See also
List of Billboard number-one Latin songs of 2013

References

2012 singles
Spanish-language songs
Don Omar songs
Universal Music Latino singles
Songs written by Don Omar
2012 songs
Machete Music singles